The men's rugby sevens tournament at the 2015 Pan American Games in Toronto, Canada was held at the Exhibition Stadium from July 11 to 12.

For the 2015 Pan American Games, the men's rugby sevens competition consisted of an 8-team tournament. The teams were grouped into two pools of four teams each for a round-robin preliminary round. All eight teams advanced to the knockout round.

Canada are the defending champions from the 2011 Pan American Games in Guadalajara, defeating Argentina, 26–24 in the final.

Qualification
A total of eight men's teams  have qualified to compete at the games. Host nation Canada, Argentina and the United States qualified automatically. The top team at the 2014, and top two at the 2015 South American Championships also qualified. The top two teams at the North American and Caribbean Championships in 2015 also qualified. Each nation may enter one team consisting of twelve athletes.

Summary

Medalists

Rosters

At the start of tournament, all eight participating countries had up to 12 players on their rosters.

Competition format
In the first round of the competition, teams were divided into two groups of four teams, and play followed a round robin format with each of the teams playing all other teams in the pool once. Teams were awarded three points for a win, two points for a draw and one point for a loss. All ties in the standings will be broken by point differential

Following the completion of the group games, all eight teams advanced to a single elimination round consisting of four quarterfinal games, two semifinal games, and the bronze and gold medal matches. Losing teams competed in classification matches to determine their ranking in the tournament. A penalty stroke competition took place, if a classification matched ended in a draw to determine a winner.

All games were played in two 7 minute halves, except the gold medal match which was played with 10-minute halves.

Draw
The draw for the groups was determined using the 2014–15 Sevens World Series standings.

Results
The official detailed schedule was revealed on June 9, 2015.

All times are Eastern Daylight Time (UTC−4)

Preliminary round

Group A

Group B

Quarterfinals

Classification round

Fifth through Eighth places

Seventh place match

Fifth place match

Medal round

Semifinals

Bronze medal match

Gold medal match

Final ranking

References

Rugby sevens at the 2015 Pan American Games